The Donegal Community Stadium is a stalled construction project in Stranorlar, Ireland. The stadium was initially intended to have a capacity of 6,800 spectators, and proposed as an association football venue to replace Finn Park as the home stadium of Finn Harps F.C. Planning permission was granted in June 2007, and ground breaking was started in May 2008. After intermediate delays, work recommenced in late 2011 with foundations in place. The project was again delayed in October 2012, with "minimal work" undertaken between 2014 and 2020, pending €6.7 million in additional government funding. In April 2021, a "provisional allocation" of government funding was reportedly announced. By May 2022, the development plans were further revised and scaled-back to account for inflation and concerns that "prices for building works have rapidly risen [in 2022]". This scaled-back proposal was reportedly given the "green light" in August 2022.

History

Initial plans (2007)
Initial drawings had the stadium planned as a 7,000 seater stadium, but minor changes were made to make it a 6,600 all-seat stadium. While planning permission was granted in 2007 and ground was broken in 2008, it wasn't until 2014 that significant building work was undertaken on site. Some of these delays were due to financial reasons, as a decline in property values mean that the new stadium was more dependent on state funding.

Updated plans (2017)
Following Finn Harps 2017 AGM in May 2017, Finn Harps announced that following a stall in progress, revised plans would be launched in summer 2017. The expected capacity of this updated proposal was projected to be between 5,500-6,000 with a seated capacity consisting of a main stand with 1,954 seats and another seated stand opposite that seating between 2,000-2,500, combined with terraced ends totaling an extra standing capacity of 1,500.

At the start of July 2018, the Department of Sport announced a €304,000 grant towards the relaunch, redraw of plans, and fees towards the restart of the stadium build in Stranorlar.

By May 2020, the project (which had reputedly seen "virtually no work carried out" since 2014) had stalled, pending a proposed investment of €6.7 million in state funding. While this situation had not changed as of September 2020, in April 2021 the government announced a "provisional allocation" of €3.99m for the development.

Revised plans (2022)
On 18 May 2022, owing to the rapidly increasing cost of supplies and demand on the construction industry, Finn Harps released further revised plans for a 6,130 capacity ground on the site.  
These revised plans included a West Stand of 1,930 seats in (as of May 2022) a partially built structure. Together with a proposed East Stand of 1,400 seats, the total seating capacity would be 3,330 alongside both touchlines. This May 2022 plan proposes that the two ends of the ground be developed as terracing, each with a capacity of 1,400. All four sides of the ground are due to be covered, with (as of mid-2022), the construction of spectator facilities expected to complete by September 2023. A new pitch would then be laid, taking a further ten months to mature. These revised plans are expected to cost in the region of €8 million. During August 2022, the Minister of State for Sport and the Gaeltacht reportedly have the "green light" to the updated proposal.

References

Finn Harps F.C.
Association football venues in the Republic of Ireland
Stadiums under construction
Association football venues in County Donegal